Wally Woodward (1922−2003) was an Australian rugby league footballer who played in the 1940s. He played for Parramatta as a halfback.  He was a foundation player of the club.

Playing career
Woodward began his rugby league career in 1947 with newly admitted side Parramatta.  Woodward was one of the local players selected to make up the new team and had no previous first grade experience.  Woodward played in Parramatta's first ever match against Newtown on April 12 1947 which ended in a 34–12 defeat at Cumberland Oval.  Parramatta went on to struggle for the remaining of their inaugural year winning just three games and claimed its first wooden spoon as a club.

References

1922 births
2003 deaths
Australian rugby league players
Parramatta Eels players
Rugby league players from Sydney
Rugby league halfbacks